Gregory K. Davis (born May 10, 1962) is an American attorney who served as the United States Attorney for the Southern District of Mississippi from 2012 to 2017.

See also
2017 dismissal of U.S. attorneys

References

1962 births
Living people
United States Attorneys for the Southern District of Mississippi
Mississippi Democrats
Mississippi State University alumni
Tulane University Law School alumni